Steffen Siepmann (born 16 September 1986) is a German professional darts player who currently playing in Professional Darts Corporation events.

Career

Nicknamed "Sippi", Siepmann first qualified for a PDC European Tour in 2017, when he reached the third round of the 2017 German Darts Masters by defeating Andrew Gilding and Joe Cullen, before losing to Simon Whitlock. Later in the year he qualified for the 2017 European Darts Open, where he defeated Jermaine Wattimena, before losing to Stephen Bunting.

On 19 January 2020, Siepmann beat Wesley Harms 5–3 to win a two-year PDC Tour Card at European Q School. He will play on the PDC ProTour in 2020 and 2021.

References

External links

Living people
German darts players
Professional Darts Corporation former tour card holders
1986 births